Stonehall is a civil parish in County Westmeath, Ireland. This name also applies to the townland of Stonehall.

Stonehall is one of 8 civil parishes in the barony of Corkaree in the Province of Leinster.

Stonehall civil parish comprises 11 townlands: Blackmiles, Galmoylestown Lower, Galmoylestown Upper, Garrysallagh, Killintown, Knockbody, Larkinstown, 
Martinstown, Monintown, Multyfarnham or Fearbranagh and Stonehall.

The neighbouring civil parishes are: Faughalstown to the north, Taghmon to the east, Tyfarnham to the south and Multyfarnham to the west and north.

References

External links
Map of Stonehall civil parish at openstreetmap.org
Stonehall civil parish at the IreAtlas Townland Data Base
Stonehall civil parish at Townlands.ie
Stonehall civil parish at The Placenames Database of Ireland

Civil parishes of County Westmeath